Claude Dupuy may refer to:
 Claude Dupuy (bishop) (1901–1989), Archbishop of Albi
 Claude Dupuy (jurist) (1545–1594), Parisian jurist, humanist and bibliophile
 Claude-Thomas Dupuy (1678–1738), French lawyer and Intendant of New France from 1726 to 1728